Events from the year 1967 in Japan.

Incumbents
Emperor: Hirohito
Prime Minister: Eisaku Satō (Liberal Democratic)
Chief Cabinet Secretary: Kenji Fukunaga until June 22, Toshio Kimura
Chief Justice of the Supreme Court: Masatoshi Yokota
President of the House of Representatives: Mitsujirō Ishii from February 15
President of the House of Councillors: Yūzō Shigemune

Governors
Aichi Prefecture: Mikine Kuwahara 
Akita Prefecture: Yūjirō Obata 
Aomori Prefecture: Shunkichi Takeuchi 
Chiba Prefecture: Taketo Tomonō 
Ehime Prefecture: Sadatake Hisamatsu 
Fukui Prefecture: Eizō Kita (until 22 April); Heidayū Nakagawa (starting 23 April)
Fukuoka Prefecture: Taichi Uzaki (until 22 April); Hikaru Kamei (starting 23 April)
Fukushima Prefecture: Morie Kimura
Gifu Prefecture: Saburō Hirano 
Gunma Prefecture: Konroku Kanda 
Hiroshima Prefecture: Iduo Nagano 
Hokkaido: Kingo Machimura 
Hyogo Prefecture: Motohiko Kanai 
Ibaraki Prefecture: Nirō Iwakami 
Ishikawa Prefecture: Yōichi Nakanishi 
Iwate Prefecture: Tadashi Chida 
Kagawa Prefecture: Masanori Kaneko 
Kagoshima Prefecture: Katsushi Terazono (until 29 April); Saburō Kanemaru (starting 30 April)
Kanagawa Prefecture: Iwataro Uchiyama (until 22 April); Bunwa Tsuda (starting 23 April) 
Kochi Prefecture: Masumi Mizobuchi 
Kumamoto Prefecture: Kōsaku Teramoto 
Kyoto Prefecture: Torazō Ninagawa 
Mie Prefecture: Satoru Tanaka 
Miyagi Prefecture: Shintaro Takahashi 
Miyazaki Prefecture: Hiroshi Kuroki 
Nagano Prefecture: Gon'ichirō Nishizawa 
Nagasaki Prefecture: Katsuya Sato 
Nara Prefecture: Ryozo Okuda 
Niigata Prefecture: Shiro Watari
Oita Prefecture: Kaoru Kinoshita 
Okayama Prefecture: Takenori Kato 
Osaka Prefecture: Gisen Satō 
Saga Prefecture: Sunao Ikeda 
Saitama Prefecture: Hiroshi Kurihara 
Shiga Prefecture: Kinichiro Nozaki 
Shiname Prefecture: Choemon Tanabe 
Shizuoka Prefecture: Toshio Saitō (until 7 January); Yūtarō Takeyama (starting 1 February)
Tochigi Prefecture: Nobuo Yokokawa 
Tokushima Prefecture: Yasunobu Takeichi 
Tokyo: Ryōtarō Azuma (until 22 April) Ryōkichi Minobe (starting 23 April)
Tottori Prefecture: Jirō Ishiba 
Toyama Prefecture: Minoru Yoshida 
Wakayama Prefecture: Shinji Ono (until 22 April); Masao Ohashi (starting 23 April)
Yamagata Prefecture: Tōkichi Abiko 
Yamaguchi Prefecture: Masayuki Hashimoto 
Yamanashi Prefecture: Hisashi Amano (until 16 February); Kunio Tanabe (starting 17 February)

Events
January 29 - General election of 1967 - Liberal Democratic Party win 277 out of 486 seats.
 February 1 – Higashiosaka city start by three cities, Fuse (布施), Kawachi (河内) and Hiraoka (枚岡) mergered in Osaka Prefecture.
March 1 - City of Hatogaya, Saitama founded.
 March 1 – Hankyū Senri Line, Osaka, Japan, opens.
 March 24 – Tanimachi Line, Osaka, Japan, opens.
 June 18 – A home-made bomb explodes on a Hyōgo-Himeji local commuter train at Shioya Station on the Sanyo Electric Railway Main Line, Kobe, Hyōgo, Japan. No one claims responsibility in this case, which kills two persons with 29 wounded.
July 10 - Heavy rain and landslides hit Kobe and Kure, kill at least 371.
August 29 - A heavy torrential rain and mudslide occur in Murakami, Shibata and Oguni area, part of Niigata Prefecture and Yamagata Prefecture, according to Fire and Disaster Management Agency of Japan confirmed report, 142 person lost to lives.
December unknown - Nitori Furniture Wholesale Center, as predecessor of furniture retailer Nitori was established in Kita-ku, Sapporo, Hokkaido.

Births
 January 1 - Nekojiru, manga artist (d. 1998)
 January 25 - Nozomu Sasaki, voice actor
 January 26 - Toshiyuki Morikawa, voice actor
 February 6 - Izumi Sakai, singer (Zard) (d. 2007)
 February 26 - Kazuyoshi Miura, footballer
 March 14 - Yūta Mochizuki, actor of 1992 Super Sentai Kyoryu Sentai Zyuranger as Tyranno Ranger/Geki
 March 15 - Naoko Takeuchi, artist
 March 27 - Kenta Kobashi, professional wrestler
 March 30 - Megumi Hayashibara, voice actress
 April 22 - Mio Sugita, politician
 May 4 - Akiko Yajima, voice actress
 May 5 -  Takehito Koyasu, voice actor
 May 6 - Kenta Satou, actor of 1989 Super Sentai of First Heisei Series Kousoku Sentai Turboranger as Red Turbo/Riki Honoo as OP and ED Himself Performing.
 May 10 - Nobuhiro Takeda, footballer and sportscaster
 June 15 - Yūji Ueda, voice actor
 June 23 - Yoko Minamino, idol, singer and actress
 June 26 - Kaori Asoh, voice actress and singer
 July 13 - Akira Hokuto, women's professional wrestler
 July 28 - Taka Hirose, musician (Feeder)
 July 31 - Minako Honda, singer and musical actress (d. 2005)
 August 8 - Yūki Amami, actress
 August 15 - Takashi Tachibana, politician
 August 22 - Yukiko Okada, singer, actress, model (d. 1986)
 August 28 - Masaaki Endoh, singer
 September 5 - Koichi Morishita, long-distance runner
 September 23 - Masashi Nakayama, footballer
 October 26 - Masaru Yamashita, actor of 1990 Metal Hero Series Tokkei Winspector.
 November 2 - Akira Ishida, voice actor
 November 28 - Renhō, politician and journalist
 December 8 - Kotono Mitsuishi, voice actress
 December 13 - Yūji Oda, singer and actor
 December 15 - Ami Kawai, actress

Deaths
July 13 – Hideo Yoshino, Tanka poet (b. 1902)
August 22 – Sanzo Wada, painter and costume designer, winner of 1954 Academy Award for Costume Design for Gate of Hell  (b. 1883)
October 20 – Shigeru Yoshida, Prime Minister of Japan (b. 1878)

See also
 1967 in Japanese television
 List of Japanese films of 1967

References 

 
1960s in Japan
Years of the 20th century in Japan